Vitali Klitschko vs. Corrie Sanders, billed as Let the Next Era Begin, was a professional boxing match contested on 24 April 2004 for the WBC Heavyweight Championship.

Background
After his TKO loss to Lennox Lewis in June 2003 Vitali Klitschko first sort out an immediate rematch, however after some initial interest Lewis ultimately declined, deciding not to fight for the rest of 2003. As a result, Klitschko faced Kirk Johnson in a WBC Heavyweight Title Eliminator stopping him in 2 rounds making him Lewis's mandatory contender.

In January 2004 Lewis announced his retirement from boxing leaving the WBC belt vacant.

Corrie Sanders caused the Upset of the Year in 2003 when he knocked out Vitali's younger brother Klitschko to win the WBO belt. After vacating the belt he agreed to face Vitali for the now vacant WBC title.

Going into the fight Vitali Klitschko was ranked as the best Heavyweight in the world by Ring magazine (Corrie Sanders was 3rd).

The fight
The fight proved to be slugfest with Sanders landing some big left hands on Vitali, but the bigger man was throwing and landing more punches.

By the eighth round Sanders was bleeding and looking worn out, he managed a last flurry which briefly troubled Klitschko, before a straight right halted the attack. Referee John Schorle stepped in towards the end of round after Sanders took a string of 20 unanswered punches giving Klitschko a TKO victory.

According to CompuBox Klitschko landed 230 punches with 56% accuracy, against Sanders's 51 punches with 22% accuracy. There were no knockdown

Aftermath
Sanders was taken to a hospital for a hematoma of his left ear however his manager, Vernon Smith, said "He's all right; he's cracking jokes. He took quite a shot behind the left ear. He was exhausted, he was tired. He did not disagree with the referee's decision. He got beaten by a better fighter."

Klitschko praised Sanders durability saying "I was surprised he never went down. He took so many punches it was unbelievable."

After Sanders' death in 2012 Vitali praised him to Bild Plus saying “Corrie Sanders was the most difficult opponent I ever fought. Corrie was fast, could give and take a punch. His style was dangerous and did not suit me. I was very pleased to be able to win this fight.”

Undercard
Confirmed bouts:

Broadcasting

References

World Boxing Council heavyweight championship matches
Boxing on HBO
2004 in boxing
Boxing in Los Angeles
2004 in sports in California
Klitschko brothers
April 2004 sports events in the United States